Another Voyage is a studio album by the Ramsey Lewis Trio issued in 1969 on Cadet Records. The album peaked at No. 5 on the Billboard Top Jazz Albums chart and No. 34 upon the Billboard Top R&B Albums chart.

Critical reception

Ed Hogan of AllMusic declared that "Another Voyage is one of the Ramsey Lewis Trio's best efforts" which "serves as a prime example of the muscular Chicago sound while preserving the pianist's trademark elegance".
John Fordham of The Guardian also noted that Lewis' "licks-playing is undeniably engaging, his sense of dynamics and drama acute, and the drumming of Maurice White, before his departure to Earth, Wind & Fire, very tight and commanding."

Track listing 
All compositions by Ramsey Lewis except as indicated

Side 1 
 "If You've Got It, Flaunt It, Pt. 1" (Lewis, Cleveland Eaton, Maurice White) - 2:49 	
 "Wandering Rose" (Neal Creque) -  4:55	
 "How Beautiful Is Spring" (Eddie Harris) - 4:33
 "Do What You Wanna" - 2:41	
 "My Cherie Amour" (Henry Cosby, Sylvia Moy, Stevie Wonder) - 3:49

Side 2 
 "Bold and Black" (Harris) - 4:07		
 "Opus Number 5" (Charles Stepney) - 5:38	
 "Uhuru" (White) - 2:20
 "Cecile" (Eaton) - 3:04
 "If You've Got It, Flaunt It, Pt. 2" 	(Eaton, Lewis, White) - 2:18

Personnel 
  Stu Black -	Engineer 
 Frank Chaplin -	Photography 
 Ken Druker -	Executive Producer 
 Cleveland Eaton - Bass 
 Randy Harter - Design 
 Bob Irwin -	Mastering 
 Hollis King -	Art Direction 
 Bryan Koniarz -	Producer 
 Ramsey Lewis -	Piano, Keyboards, Electric piano, Producer, Original Recording Producer 
 Jayme Pieruzzi	- Mastering 
 Roger Poznan -	Cover Photo 
 Mark Cooper Smith -	Production Assistant 
 Sherniece Smith -	Art Producer 
 Charles Stepney -	Supervisor 
 Phil Upchurch -	Electric guitar 
 Maurice White -	Percussion, Drums, Kalimba

Charts

References 

 

Ramsey Lewis albums
1969 albums
Cadet Records albums
Jazz-funk albums